The 1958 Albanian National Championship was the 21st season of the Albanian National Championship, the top professional league for association football clubs, since its establishment in 1930.

Overview
It was contested by 8 teams, and Partizani won the championship.

League standings

Note: '17 Nëntori' is KF Tirana and 'Lokomotiva Durrës' is Teuta

Results

References
Albania - List of final tables (RSSSF)
Albania - Sport news and tips (RSSSF) 

Kategoria Superiore seasons
1
Albania
Albania